Bath Township is one of sixteen townships in Cerro Gordo County, Iowa, USA.  As of the 2000 census, its population was 337.

Geography
The city of Rockwell (population about 1000) borders it to the south. The southern part of the township to its north likewise remains unincorporated, while its northern portion includes most of Mason City, with a population of about 30,000. (Mason City was the childhood home of Meredith Wilson, who is said to have modeled after it "River City, Iowa", the setting for his musical The Music Man.)

References

External links
 US-Counties.com
 City-Data.com

Townships in Cerro Gordo County, Iowa
Mason City, Iowa micropolitan area
Townships in Iowa